31179 Gongju, provisional designation , is a stony Nysian asteroid from the inner regions of the asteroid belt, approximately  in diameter. It was discovered on 21 December 1997, by Japanese amateur astronomer Naoto Sato at his Chichibu Observatory near Tokyo, central Japan. The S-type asteroid has a rotation period of 4.8 hours and possibly an elongated shape. It was named for the South Korean city of Gongju.

Orbit and classification 

Gongju is a member of the Nysa family, the largest asteroid family of the main belt, consisting of stony and carbonaceous subfamilies. The family, named after 44 Nysa, is located near the 3:1 orbital resonance with Jupiter, a depleted zone that separates the inner from the intermediate asteroid belt.

It orbits the Sun in the inner asteroid belt at a distance of 2.0–2.9 AU once every 3 years and 10 months (1,394 days; semi-major axis of 2.44 AU). Its orbit has an eccentricity of 0.19 and an inclination of 3° with respect to the ecliptic.

Physical characteristics 

Based on the Moving Object Catalog (MOC) of the Sloan Digital Sky Survey, Gongju has a spectral type of a stony S-type asteroid.

Rotation period 

In October 2012, a rotational lightcurve of Gongju was obtained from photometric observations by American astronomer John Ruthroff at the Shadowbox Observatory in Indiana. Lightcurve analysis gave a well-defined rotation period of 4.829 hours with a high brightness amplitude of 0.80 magnitude, indicative of a non-spherical shape.

Diameter and albedo 

According to the survey carried out by the NEOWISE mission of NASA's Wide-field Infrared Survey Explorer, Gongju measures 4.675 kilometers in diameter and its surface has an albedo of 0.353, while the Collaborative Asteroid Lightcurve Link assumes an albedo of 0.21 and calculates a diameter of 5.04 kilometers based on an absolute magnitude of 13.8.

Naming 

This minor planet was named after the South Korean city of Gongju, located in Chungcheongnam-do Province. It has a population of approximately 120,000 and was the capital of Baekje dynasty in the 5th century AD and the seat of the provincial government until 1932. The official naming citation was published by the Minor Planet Center on 14 May 2014.

References

External links 
 Asteroid Lightcurve Database (LCDB), query form (info )
 Dictionary of Minor Planet Names, Google books
 Discovery Circumstances: Numbered Minor Planets (30001)-(35000) – Minor Planet Center
 
 

031179
Discoveries by Naoto Sato
Named minor planets
19971221